The Conservative Democrats of Slovakia (KDS) is a defunct Slovak political party established by four MPs (František Mikloško, Vladimír Palko, Rudolf Bauer and Pavol Minárik) who belonged to the Christian Democratic Movement, but left it on 21 February 2008 over disagreements with the party leader. The party was established in July 2008. The party was dissolved in 2014.

KDS announced that František Mikloško would contest the 2009 presidential election. Mikloško received 5.41% of the vote.

Footnotes

External links
Official website 

Conservative parties in Slovakia
Eurosceptic parties in Slovakia
Libertas.eu
National conservative parties
2008 establishments in Slovakia
Political parties established in 2008
Political parties disestablished in 2014
Right-wing parties in Europe
Right-wing politics in Slovakia
Christian Democratic Movement breakaway groups